Imperial Medicals Rugby Club ("Imperial Medics") is the name given to the rugby union team of Imperial College School of Medicine Students' Union, a modern amalgam of three formerly distinct hospital rugby clubs each with a long history, having all been founded in the nineteenth century. The teams from Charing Cross Hospital
and Westminster Hospital were the first to merge in 1984 following the union of their respective Medical Departments. When St Mary's Hospital, London also merged in 1997 the team was strengthened by one of the two most successful hospital sides in London. Imperial Medics is notable for its recent dominance of the oldest competition in rugby, the United Hospitals Cup, as well as its history and the joint history of its constituent elements which have produced a large number of international players.

History
The history of Imperial Medicals Rugby Club is the combined history of three older sides, and their joint history from the point of merger:

St Mary's Hospital Medical School - October 1865
Charing Cross Hospital Medical School - 1875
Westminster Hospital Medical School - 1897
Charing Cross and Westminster Medical School - 1981
Imperial College School of Medicine - 1997

Competitions
Since Inauguration in 1997 IMRFC have enjoyed the following successes:
 United Hospitals Cup Winners - 98, 99, 00, 02, 03, 04, 05, 06, 07, 08, 10, 11, 14
 United Hospital Cup Sevens Winners - 00, 04, 05, 06, 08, 12, 13, 17
 JPR Williams Cup Winners (IMRFC v Imperial College) - 03, 04, 05, 06, 07, 08, 09, 10, 11, 14
 Winners of Herts/Middlesex 1 Courage League and Promotion to London North West 3 - 1999
 Promotion to BUSA Premiership South in 1999, 2003, 2006, 2010
 2nd XV United Hospitals Cup Winners - 01, 03, 06, 07, 08, 10, 11, 14
 2nd XV Varsity Match Winners - 05, 06, 07, 08, 09, 10, 11, 15
 2nd XV Middlesex Merit League Division 3 Winners - 07
 3rd XV United Hospitals Cup Winners - 01, 02, 03, 06, 07, 08, 09, 10, 11, 12, 13, 14, 15
 3rd XV Varsity Match Winners - 05, 06, 07, 08, 09, 10, 11, 14, 17

Notable former players

Internationals

St Mary's
Source:

 - : D J Cussen (1921-27)
 - Tuppy Owen-Smith (1934-37) - captain, also 5 caps for the South Africa cricket team
 - Tommy Kemp (1937-48) - captain
 - Edward Scott (1947-48) - captain
 - Nim Hall (1947-55)
 - Norman "Billy" Bennett (1947-48)
 - Lewis Cannell (1948-57)
 - : James Murphy O'Connor (1954) - possibly the first player to use the round-the-corner style of goal-kicking at international level and the brother of Cardinal Cormac Murphy-O'Connor
 - N M Campbell (1956)
 - Trevor Wintle (1966-69)
 - JPR Williams (1969-81)
 - Kevin Simms (1985-88)
 - Richard Wintle (1988)

Westminster
Sidney Nelson Crowther (1903)

Imperial Medicals
 - Nnamdi Obi - England Sevens, England Students
 - James Logan - England Students
 - Dimitri Amiras - Greece
 - Tom Rees
 - Vaki Antoniou

Notable non-internationals
David Rocyn-Jones, a former president of the Welsh Rugby Union

References

External links

Imperial Medicals on Twitter

Clubs and societies of Imperial College London
Rugby clubs established in 1997
University and college rugby union clubs in England
Rugby union clubs in London
United Hospitals sports clubs
1997 establishments in England
Rugby Club
Student sport in London